The Dip Falls, a cascade waterfall over cubic-basalt formed rocks on the Dip River, is located in Mawbanna in the North West region of Tasmania, Australia.

Location and features

See also

 List of waterfalls of Tasmania

References

External links

Waterfalls of Tasmania
North West Tasmania